Zodarion morosum is a spider species found in Bulgaria, Greece, Turkey, Ukraine and Russia.

See also 
 List of Zodariidae species

References

External links 

morosum
Spiders of Europe
Spiders of Russia
Arthropods of Turkey
Spiders described in 1935